The Changing People, dubbed the Deviants by the Eternals, are a fictional race of humanoids appearing in American comic books published by Marvel Comics.

In the Marvel Universe, the Deviants are the end product of a series of DNA tests known as Homo descendus, created by the enigmatic alien Celestials. Their race is largely insensitive and they view all other species as a threat. They even distrust each other and often get in their own way.

Publication history

The Deviants first appeared in The Eternals #1 (July 1976).

Fictional history
They are an offshoot of the evolutionary process that created sentient life on Earth instigated by the alien Celestials, and wage war against their counterparts, the Eternals.

While the Eternals possess godlike power and are generally physically beautiful, the Deviants (who sometimes refer to themselves as 'the Changing People') are for the most part hideous, with each member of their race possessing some random physical and/or cosmetic mutation that is by Celestial design never repeated within the sub-species. Extremely mutated or deformed Deviants are referred to as "mutates" and some of the monsters of myth and legend have in fact been identified as Deviant mutates. Some of these mutations can provide superhuman abilities, but their powers are usually not as great as those of the Eternals.

According to the account of one Deviant in the 2006 comic book mini-series, the Deviants were created as a delicacy to be consumed en masse by Celestials at periodic intervals once they multiplied sufficiently. The veracity of this has been revealed untrue as the Deviants and the Eternals were actually created because the Celestials saw the human population as a useful pathogen to act as antibodies against the Horde, so the Deviants and the Eternals were to defend the process under the false impression that they were actually protecting the human race.

The Deviants are religious, revering the Dreaming Celestial ("He Who Sleeps in Darkness"). They credit him with their creation and claim that he granted them dominion over the Earth, an agreement they believe was later broken by the treachery of the other Celestials. They have one or more holy books—the only one named thus far being the Book of Krask.

The Deviants had already developed advanced technology such as genetic engineering when humans were still living in caves.

At some point in prehistoric times, some Deviants chased after Vnn and his lover Brrkk. When Brrkk died, Vnn found the corpse of a Tyrannosaurus that previously possessed the Star Brand. Vnn absorbed the Star Brand powers and used them to defeat the Deviants.

In the advent of the heroic age, Brother Tode was leading the Deviants, with his capital in the city of the Toads in the sunken continent of Lemuria. When the Fourth Celestial Host arrived on Earth, Deviants soldiers led by Warlord Kro attacked New York City in an attempt to provoke fear in the humans and trick them into attacking the Celestials. When this attempt failed, the Deviants sent an attack team to the Celestial spaceship, which failed too.

Later, the Deviants' aristocracy, led by Brother Tode, attacked Olympia and kidnapped the Eternals with the intent to disintegrate them. However, the hero Iron Man (James Rhodes) rescued the Eternals and helped them in the defeat of the Deviants. The Eternals transformed the Deviants' aristocracy into a synthetic cube, killing them. Only Warlord Kro escaped with the help of his old lover Thena of the Eternals.

Without the aristocracy, the Deviants' priests seized power, led by Priestlord Ghaur, who killed the son of Tode, Ranar. Kro returned to Lemuria and was crowned as a figurehead monarch, with the real power in the hands of Ghaur. With their new leader, the Deviants battled the Eternals again. Ghaur absorbed the power of the Dreaming Celestial and tried to ascend to godhood, but was defeated by the Eternals and the Avengers and was disintegrated. Kro was left as king of the Deviants.

Ghaur returned to corporeal form and tried to obtain the Serpent Crown with help of the Atlantean Lemurians, led by Llyra, in an attempt to invoke the Old God Set. The Avengers and Fantastic Four put an end to their mad plan and Ghaur was disintegrated once more. Without Ghaur, and with the abdication of Kro, the Deviants' society fall into anarchy and revolution. First, a warlord called Brutus tried to conquer the different races of the subterrain, but was killed when the Deviants discovered his mutate origin. Later Brother Visara led the Deviants in killing all the leaders and their followers. He was ultimately killed as well.

Later, Kro led a group of  heroic Deviants, the Delta Network to rescue the Avengers from a resurrected Ghaur, who used his powers to control the Deviants once more. Ghaur (in a form of a giant statue) and the Deviants fought the Eternals and the Heroes for Hire, when the mad priest created an Anti-Mind in his plan to rule the world.

Kro and Ghaur formed bickering factions and kept the struggle for power for Deviant Lemuria. The external world did not know who was in charge. Ghaur risked a war with Wakanda after he discovered that his rejected (human-like) daughter was alive in that country. The Wakandan forces sieged Lemuria and the tension grew. Finally, the daughter was declared officially dead and Ghaur saved face.

Much later, the Deviant males were rendered sterile by a plague, the anarchy reigned, and a power contest between Ereshkigal and Ghaur happened. Ghaur won when he promised the Deviants the return of the fertility with the help of the kidnapped Eternal Phastos and the Eternal's resurrection machine. The Asgardian god Thor rescued Phastos and battled Ghaur. When the Unbiding Stone (a doomsday artifact stolen by Erishkigal) was destroyed, Ghaur and Erishkigal disappeared and Kro was left leading the Deviants.

Membership

Deviants
A Deviant is a modified human with unstable genetics, that provokes different forms and abilities.

 Kro – A Deviant Warlord who is the ruler of Lemuria and head of the Delta Network. Kro is a long-lived shapeshifter.
 Ahqlau – Conspirator and friend of Yrdisis who posed as an ally of Kro, but was actually spying on him for Ghaur.
 Argos the Hunter – Member of the Sword of Damocles who pursued Arcadia Deville and Ulysses Bloodstone. Argos the Hunter wore armor and wielded a cosmic energy staff.
 Broop – The jester to Brother Tode. He was merged with the others into a giant cube by the Eternals and is presumed dead.
 Brother Tode – The monarch and former ruler of Lemuria. He was killed by molecular reassembly by the Eternals
 Brother Visara – A charismatic leader that led the Deviants in a revolution against all forms of leadership. However, he was also killed by the angry Deviants for his hypocrisy.
 Chudar – A horned, red-skinned Deviant who attends to Kro.
 Coal – A Deviant who was sent by Ghaur to retrieve the Proteus Horn but was mistaken for Sunspot by Namorita.
 Darg – A pink-skinned Deviant who observed a gladiatorial match involving the Avengers. He had his sword stolen by the Black Knight.
 Dark Angel/Tzabaoth (Donald & Deborah Ritter) – The twin children of Thena and Kro and members of the Delta Network
 Dragona – member of the Delta Force; sister of Ereshkigal and former lover of Brother Tode, able to fly and breathe fire
 Dulpus – The former leader of a group that attempted to assist in the takeover of Earth to gain favor from Kang the Conqueror. He sent Glomm into single combat against Warbird.
 Enigmo – Member of Delta Force and former gladiator. He is not to be confused with Cataphrax, who wrestled under the name Enigmo (see Deviant Mutates, below)
 Ereshkigal – The sister of Dragona who was mistaken in the past for Hecate. She apparently committed suicide after losing a contest against the Living Tribunal.
 Fascit – He was in charge of the operation to transform Margo Damian into a Deviant.
 Finn – Member of the Damocles Foundation who received the Celestial's Gatherer from Lucas Guthrie. He was killed when the Gatherer went on a rampage.
 Frathag – Member of the priesthood who took charge of the Fifth Host. Killed by an angry mob of Deviants when Kro exposed "purity time" as a falsehood.
 Gelt – A tentacle-armed Deviant who worshipped the Dreaming Celestial.
 General Dasrax – He was member of Kro's conspiracy against the priesthood, but was forced to shoot himself in the head by Ghaur in front of Kro to demonstrate his power.
 Ghaur – The priest-lord of Lemuria who aspired to steal the power of the Dreaming Celestial. He usually competed with Kro for the leadership of the Deviants.
 Haag – A Deviant who advocated the Slicer following the rule of Brutus.
 Ignatz – A small, winged Deviant who served as the flying steed of Ant-Man.
 Jorro – A weapons maker and unwilling servant of Terminus.
 Karygmax – A priest who ordered Cataphrax to submit to purity time. Karygmax was involved in the resurrection of Ghaur. His current whereabouts are unknown.
 Kra – A large, winged Deviant who commanded a massive Deviant army.
 Nuncio Klarheit – A priest-lord who served Ghaur and accompanied Kro to the Pyramid of Winds to recover a vial and transported it back to Lemuria.
 Lugner – A Deviant who spied on Kro for Ghaur by posing as his assistant (although Kro was aware of his true nature). Lugner's current whereabouts are unknown.
 Maelstrom – The son of Morga and Phaeder. Because he was half Deviant, half Inhuman he was sent to the Lemuria Slave Pits.
 Marcelus – Member of the Damocles Foundation. He was dispatched to Brazil to capture the Black Queen, but she turned him into stone.
 Medula – Partner of Maelstrom and mother of Ransak the Reject. Her current whereabouts are unknown.
 Morga – Partner of Phaeder and the mother of Maelstrom. She was killed by the other Deviants for looking too human-like.
 Morjak – A Deviant exhibiting a second face on his torso. He worshipped the Dreaming Celestial.
 Odysseus Indigo – The CEO of Damocles Foundation. He is able to hypnotize others or nullify super-powers.
 Plokohrel – A famous artist from 100th dynasty.
 Phraug – The former ruler of Lemuria. He was slain during the Great Cataclysm (AKA the Sinking of Atlantis).
 Pyre – A Deviant who is a member of the Sword of Damocles. Pyre possesses fire powers.
 Queen Vira – Queen of the Deviants. She was transformed into inert matter and merged with others of Deviant population into a cube by Eternals. She is currently deceased.
 Ragar – The Prime Minister who held contempt for Kro. He is currently trapped inside the Deviant cube by the Eternals.
 Ranar – A government official who is the son of Brother Tode. He was killed by the priesthood.
 Randy Lee Watson – Real name unknown. He worked for the Damocles Foundation. Randy enlisted the aid of Lucas Guthrie in capturing a Celestial Gatherer, but died when a guard shot him.
 Ransak the Reject – A gladiator who is an ally to the Eternals and a pupil of Kingo Sunen. He is an outcast as he looks like a human.
 Shelmar – A warrior and former gunner aboard Kro's flagship. His current whereabouts are unknown.
 Sledge – A Deviant who was initially thought to be a mutant. Sledge enhanced Blob and Mimic's powers. He is an associate of Risque and a favor broker.
 Sluice – An administrator who is part of Brother Tode's council, disliked Kro, presumably part of the group merged into a solid cube by the Eternals.
 Spike – He was sent by Ghaur to retrieve the Proteus Horn and was mistaken for one of the New Mutants by Namorita.
 Stranglehold – A member of the Sword of Damocles who pursued Arcadia and Ulysses. He possesses superhuman strength.
 Stra'an –
 String – sent by Ghaur to retrieve the Proteus Horn, mistaken for Warlock by Namorita
 Taras Vol – A Lemurian who was captured and mutated by Cole, Gort, and One-Eye. He was killed during the Great Cataclysm (AKA the Sinking of Atlantis).
 Thunder – A Deviant who impersonated the Incan thunder god Catequil in the Andes Mountains.
 Tobias – A Deviant who attempted to kill a Deviant child for being a mutate, but it was rescued by Dragona. His current whereabouts are unknown.
 El Toro Rojo – A renegade fighter and Delta Network member. He was bonded to Tupac Amaru, an autistic child.
 Ulysses Dragonblood – The brother of Odysseus Indigo and former member of the Damocles Foundation. He is able to sedate others with a touch.
 Veeg – Also known as Veerg, he is a member of the Damocles Foundation. Veeg secretly aided Sledge, Ulysses Dragonblood, Arcadia Deville, and X-Force in entering the Foundation's Amazon headquarters using the teleportation devices there.
 Weller – Member of the Damocles Foundation who received the Celestial Gatherer from Lucas Guthrie. His current whereabouts are unknown.
 Yrdisis – An artist and lover of Khoryphos who helped to smuggle the victims of Slicer out of Lemuria until she was uncovered by Brother Visaara. She was later captured by Weird Sisters to aid in resurrection of Maelstrom but was rescued by the Eternals. Her current whereabouts are unknown
 Zakka – A toolmaker who built a time-displacer that was able to bring forth ancient warriors. He summoned Tutinax, but was killed by him.
 Zona – A member of the Sword of Damacles who could turn invisible and generate electric shocks.

Deviant Mutates
The Deviant Mutates are the creations of the Deviants. Among the known Deviant Mutates are:
 Bandrhude – A type of Deviant mutate that were used prior to Great Cataclysm (AKA the Sinking of Atlantis). Bandrhude was later used in the modern era by Ghaur and Kro.
 Brutus – A Deviant Mutate who briefly led the Deviants after Ghaur's seeming destruction by the Dreaming Celestial. Brutus organized the Subterranean wars and persecution of Deviant mutates. Brutus was killed when he was exposed as a mutate.
 Cataphrax – A warrior and former wrestler in the Unlimited Class Wrestling Federation that has strength rivaling Ikaris. He was the victim of the 5th Host and was mercy-killed by Thena.
 Dromedan – Dromedan was bred by the Deviants as a weapon against the Eternals. Imprisoned beneath New York City by the Eternals. Dromedan has vast psionic powers, including mind control, illusions and telekinesis. He can also emit destructive energy blasts, and transform matter.
 Giganto – A servant of the Mole Man, briefly raised Inorganic Technotroid with its mate, abandoned it after it lost interest. It once made attempt to rule earth, guarded Monster Island for Kro, later became a servant to Mole Man
 Glomm – A servant of Dulpus that was defeated by Warbird in single combat.
 Gorgilla – Member of the Fin Fang Four. He was formerly used as a pawn by Kro through the Brain Mines and was used to rampage in New York City. Gorgilla later befriended Doctor Druid after being freed by him. Gorgilla was later shrunk to human size by Reed Richard's molecular compactor and became the janitor of the Baxter Building. Gorgilla. helped Elektro, Fin Fang Foom and Googam defeat Tim Boo Ba.
 Gort – An agent of Brutus that was defeated by the Hulk.
 Grottu – It was produced through the Deviant mutate stockpiles. Grottu battled Ulysses Bloodstone, but was exterminated by him. Grottu's spirit later possessed Ant-Man (Scott Lang).
 Karkas – A former gladiator who allied with the Eternals. Karkas was trained by the scholars in Olympia and assisted in Kro's rebellion against Ghaur. Karkus was later defeated by Reject.
 Lizard Men – A race of Deviant mutates in the form of reptilian humanoids that reside in Subterranea. A bunch of Lizard Men were once used as agents of Kro and journeyed to Midnight Mountain and attempted to help capture Makkari
 Megataur – A monster serving the Mole Man.
 Metabo – A Deviant Mutate that was engineered by Kro. Metabo was able to absorb cosmic energy from Eternals. It was briefly considered for Delta Force.
 Minotaur – A monster that was possibly the creature formerly contained within the labyrinths of Aegean sea. The Minotaur battled Ikaris.
 Molten Man-Thing – A creature from a volcano who invaded the island of Napuka. It battled Makkari (who was posing as Frank Harper). The Molten Man-Thing was defeated when its heat energy was dissipated by immense fan.
 Spore – A Deviant Mutate that was created millennia ago as the ultimate weapon against the Eternals. The Spore gained immortality from consuming Eternals, but was destroyed circa 18000 BC by the Celestial second host. The Spore's particles were incorporated into the cocaine crop of General Caridad. Spore destroyed by Sister Salvation.
 Tricephalous – A three-headed monster that lives on Monster Isle and is servant of Mole Man.
 Tutinax the Mountain Mover – A Deviant mutate and a gladiator who aided Dromedan during the time of the second host. He was summoned from the past by Zakka, but then killed the latter. He was eventually returned to his own time. In the modern era, he nearly beat Quasar to death when he interfered in a match.
 World-Devouring Worm – A mutated earthworm released by Dromedan from a "Deviant Coagulation Chamber." It grew larger with each passing second, and could suck objects into its body with a vacuum-like wind. Virako destroyed the World-Devouring Worm by absorbing energies from his craft, destroying himself in the process.

Deviants of the planet Lyonesse
 Blackwulf (Pelops) – The son of Tantalus and leader of the Underground Legion. He was slain by his father and served as a meal to the Peacekeepers.
 Blackwulf (Lucian) – The brother and successor of Pelops and the son of Tantalus. Lucian killed his father and absorbed his power His current whereabouts are unknown.
 Bristle – Member of the Peacekeepers.
 Id – The son of Tantalus and brother of Blackwulf (Pelops and Lucien). Its current whereabouts are unknown.
 Khult – A Deviant from Tebbel who is the father of Nirvana. He became servant of Tantalus but usurped his rule of Armechadon at the same time. He helped Blackwulf temporarily slay Tantalus.
 Lady Trident – A member of the Peacekeepers who was killed one of Touchstone's bodies. However, she was placed in stasis by another Touchstone.
 Mammoth (William "Willie" Amos) – A member of the Underground Legion and possibly the past self of Wraath. His arm was cut off by Blackwulf (Lucian) to save him from the Black Legacy.
 Nirvana – The daughter of Khult, wife of Tantalus, and mother of Lucian, Pelops and Id. She committed suicide after giving birth of Lucian. Her body was preserved in undead form by Khult and was later released into death with Lucian's aid
 Pandara – A servant of Lord Tantalus. His current whereabouts are unknown.
 Schizo – Member of the Peacekeepers and the sister of Touchstone. She was rendered comatose by Touchstone.
 Tantalus – The Armechadonian Deviant who is the father of Pelops, Lucian, and Id, and the husband of Nirvana. He used the Peacekeepers as agents on Earth. Tantalus was killed by Blackwulf (Lucian).
 Touchstone – Member of the Underground Legion and the sister of Pandara. 24 of her forms were destroyed by Tantalus.
 Toxin – Member of the Underground Legion. His armor was destroyed by Tantalus. Toxin later allied himself with Tantalus against the Underground in hopes that he could rebuild his armor. However, he returned to Earth alongside the Peacekeepers.
 Wraath (William "Willie" Amos) – Member of the Peacekeepers. He is a cyborg who is possibly the future self of Mammoth.

Delta Network
The Delta Network, also referred to as the Delta Force (no relation to the real life Delta Force), was the name of a group of Deviants. The Delta Network was a group of Deviant warriors who were organized by Warlord Kro. When the Avengers were captured by the Deviant priesthood, Kro called the members into action to rescue them. Delta Network members included: Ransak the Reject, Karkas, Enigmo, and Donald and Deborah Ritter (the twin children of Thena and Kro). The Delta Network appeared only in Avengers #370–371. The group was created out of pre-existing characters by Glenn Herdling and Geof Isherwood.

Skrulls

The Skrulls are nearly all Deviants who eliminated the other offshoots of their species, leaving only one of the original race (Prime Skrull) and a Skrull Eternal (Kly'bn).

In other media
The Deviants made their film debut in Eternals, set in the Marvel Cinematic Universe. Kro appears in the film as well, serving as the Deviants' leader. They are a monstrous race of near-immortal beings genetically engineered by the Celestials and are the historical enemies of the Eternals, their racial cousins. They were engineered to progress and ensure the development of life in the universe by wiping out apex predators on various planets, until they evolved to hunt down and wipe out all life, leading to the creation of the Eternals to stop them.

References

External links
 Deviants at Marvel.com
 Deviants at Marvel Wiki
 Deviants at Comic Vine
  Deviants at Appendix Eternal Profiles
 Deviants at MarvelDirectory.com

Characters created by Jack Kirby
Comics characters introduced in 1964
Lemuria (continent) in fiction
Marvel Comics characters who are shapeshifters
Marvel Comics supervillain teams